Avshalom Caspi (born May 5, 1960) is an Israeli-American psychologist and the Edward M. Arnett Professor of Psychology and Neuroscience in the Trinity College of Arts and Sciences at Duke University, as well as Professor of Personality Development at King's College London's Institute of Psychiatry, Psychology and Neuroscience. He is known for his research on mental health and human development, much of which he has conducted with his wife and longtime research partner, Terrie Moffitt. The two first met when they presented adjacent posters at a 1987 conference in St. Louis, Missouri entitled "Deviant Pathways from Childhood to Adulthood". Among Caspi's notable discoveries was that of an association between the 5-HTTLPR polymorphism and clinical depression. This discovery, originally reported in a 2003 study, spurred a wave of subsequent research on the potential genetic roots of various psychiatric conditions. However, a 2017 meta-analysis did not support the original finding, nor did a large analysis with nearly 100% power to detect the original finding. Therefore, the general approach of candidate gene or candidate gene by environment interaction research in single small studies is no longer widely accepted.

One of the most interesting studies of Avshalom Caspi is his studies about the Monoamine oxidase A gene variation and the risk of antisocial behavior in the presence of childhood abuse as a study of gene and environment interaction, which was further validated by some follow up studies despite some others which did not.

He and Moffitt have also collaborated on the Dunedin Multidisciplinary Health and Development Study since the 1980s.

Education
Caspi graduated from University of California, Santa Cruz with a B.A. in psychology in 1981. He received his M.A. in 1983 and Ph.D. in 1986 in developmental psychology from Cornell University as part of the Human Development department. His doctoral dissertation was entitled Moving against and moving away: Life-course patterns of explosive and withdrawn children.

Honors and awards
Caspi is a fellow of the Association for Psychological Science and the British Academy. He and Moffitt were co-recipients of the 2010 Klaus J. Jacobs Research Prize and Best Practice Award from the Jacobs Foundation, as well as the 2016 APA Award for Distinguished Scientific Contributions to Psychology. In 2013 Caspi was awarded an honorary doctorate from Tilburg University in The Netherlands. In November 2022 Caspi was awarded the Royal Society Te Apārangi's Rutherford Medal, along with the Dunedin Study, team leader Richie Poulton and team members Murray Thomson and Terrie Moffitt.

References

External links

21st-century American psychologists
1960 births
Living people
Duke University faculty
Israeli emigrants to the United States
People from Jerusalem
University of California, Santa Cruz alumni
Cornell University alumni
American epidemiologists
Academics of King's College London
Fellows of the Association for Psychological Science
Fellows of the British Academy
20th-century American psychologists